The Free Software Song is a filk song by Richard M. Stallman about free software.  The song is set to the melody of the Bulgarian "Sadi Moma".

A version of this song is also performed by a band (the GNU/Stallmans) during the credits of the documentary Revolution OS. In 1998, Matt Loper recorded a techno version of the song. Jono Bacon also recorded a heavy metal version of the song, and the band Fenster recorded a rhythmic version. In addition, there is a Spanish pop punk version  recorded by ALEC, and a Rick Astley mashup, "Never Gonna Give GNU Up".

A version is used in the free software karaoke video game Sinatra.

Lyrics

Join us now and share the software;
You'll be free, hackers, you'll be free.
Join us now and share the software;
You'll be free, hackers, you'll be free.

Hoarders can get piles of money,
That is true, hackers, that is true.
But they cannot help their neighbors;
That's not good, hackers, that's not good.

When we have enough free software
At our call, hackers, at our call,
We'll kick out those dirty licenses
Ever more, hackers, ever more.

Join us now and share the software;
You'll be free, hackers, you'll be free.
Join us now and share the software;
You'll be free, hackers, you'll be free.

The lyrics have been placed in the public domain.

References

External links

 The Free Software Song at the official GNU Project Website
 
 An SATB choir version on the Choral Public Domain Library and the same arrangement at the International Music Score Library Project

Filk songs
Free software culture and documents
Works about intellectual property law
Public domain music
American songs
Bulgarian songs
Propaganda songs
Hacker culture
1993 songs